Białe Błota may refer to:

Białe Błota, Aleksandrów County in Kuyavian-Pomeranian Voivodeship (north-central Poland)
Białe Błota, Bydgoszcz County in Kuyavian-Pomeranian Voivodeship (north-central Poland)
Białe Błota, Lipno County in Kuyavian-Pomeranian Voivodeship (north-central Poland)
Białe Błota, Mogilno County in Kuyavian-Pomeranian Voivodeship (north-central Poland)
Białe Błota, Świecie County in Kuyavian-Pomeranian Voivodeship (north-central Poland)
Białe Błota, Pomeranian Voivodeship (north Poland)